Neukom Vivarium is a 2006 mixed media installation by American artist Mark Dion, located at Olympic Sculpture Park in Seattle, Washington, United States. The work features a  Western hemlock that fell outside of Seattle in 1996, acting as a nurse log within an  greenhouse. According to the Seattle Art Museum, which operates the park, the tree "inhabits an art system" consisting of bacteria, fungi, insects, lichen and plants. The installation supplies magnifying glasses to visitors wanting a closer inspection; they are provided field guides in the form of tiles.

The installation was donated by Bill and Sally Neukom, American Express Company, Seattle Garden Club, Mark Torrance Foundation and Committee of 33, in honor of the Seattle Art Museum's 75th anniversary. It was Dion's first permanent public work of art in the United States. The architect for the structure was Owen Richards Architects.

Description
Neukom Vivarium is a mixed media installation by American artist Mark Dion, located at Olympic Sculpture Park in Seattle, Washington. The work's design was approved in 2004 and completed in 2006. The Seattle Art Museum, which operates the park, described Neukom Vivarium as a "hybrid work of sculpture, architecture, environmental education and horticulture that connects art and science." It features a  nurse log, formerly part of a forest ecosystem that now "inhabits an art system", housed within an  greenhouse. The greenhouse includes a cabinet designed by Dion that supplies magnifying glasses, allowing visitors to inspect the log for various life forms. Field guides are present in the form of blue and white tiles, depicting bacteria, fungi, insects, lichen and plants that may be found on the log.

Dion had hoped to feature one of two tree species for the installation—Douglas fir or Western hemlock—the former for its "mythic presence" and the latter for its charisma, and for being the state tree of Washington. The hemlock used for Neukom Vivarium fell outside of Seattle on February 8, 1996, in a protected drainage basin with old-growth forest. As a result of this incident, the biodegradation process was decelerated. According to Dion, the tree "had just fallen into [their] lap" and was suitable for its accessibility, personality and size. He said of the exhibit:

Neukom Vivarium was a gift from Bill and Sally Neukom, American Express Company, Seattle Garden Club, Mark Torrance Foundation and Committee of 33, in honor of the Seattle Art Museum's 75th anniversary. The work was Dion's first permanent public work of art in the United States.

See also
 2006 in architecture
 2006 in art
 Environmental education in the United States
 Host Analog (1991) by Buster Simpson, Portland, Oregon
 List of individual trees
 Living sculpture

References

External links
 

2006 establishments in Washington (state)
2006 sculptures
Art in Washington (state)
Buildings and structures completed in 2006
Buildings and structures in Seattle
Environmental education in the United States
Greenhouses in Washington (state)
Individual trees in Washington (state)
Olympic Sculpture Park
Sculptures by American artists